Fabiana Mollica (born 25 December 1983) is an Italian former bobsledder. She competed in the two woman event at the 2006 Winter Olympics.

References

External links
 

1983 births
Living people
Italian female bobsledders
Olympic bobsledders of Italy
Bobsledders at the 2006 Winter Olympics
People from Verbania
Sportspeople from the Province of Verbano-Cusio-Ossola